In enzymology, a 4-hydroxy-tetrahydrodipicolinate reductase is an enzyme that catalyzes the chemical reaction

(S)-2,3,4,5-tetrahydropyridine-2,6-dicarboxylate + NAD(P)+ + H2O  (2S,4S)-4-hydroxy-2,3,4,5-tetrahydrodipicolinate + NAD(P)H + H+

The 3 substrates of this enzyme are (S)-2,3,4,5-tetrahydropyridine-2,6-dicarboxylate, NAD+ or NADP+, and H2O, whereas its 3 products are (2S,4S)-4-hydroxy-2,3,4,5-tetrahydrodipicolinate, NADH or NADPH, and H+.

This enzyme participates in lysine biosynthesis.

Nomenclature 

This enzyme belongs to the family of oxidoreductases, specifically those acting on CH or CH2 groups with NAD+ or NADP+ as acceptor.  The systematic name of this enzyme class is (S)-2,3,4,5-tetrahydropyridine-2,6-dicarboxylate:NAD(P)+ 4-oxidoreductase. Other names in common use include:
 dihydrodipicolinate reductase, 
 dihydrodipicolinic acid reductase, and 
 2,3,4,5-tetrahydrodipicolinate:NAD(P)+ oxidoreductase.

References

Further reading 

 
 
 

NADPH-dependent enzymes
EC 1.17.1
NADH-dependent enzymes
Enzymes of known structure